The Atlantic City Diablos were an American soccer team based in Atlantic City, New Jersey, United States. Founded in 2007, the team played in the National Premier Soccer League (NPSL), a national amateur league at the fourth tier of the American Soccer Pyramid, until 2008, when the franchise folded and the team left the league.

The team played its home games in the athletic stadium at St. Augustine College Preparatory School in nearby Richland, New Jersey. The team's colors were blue, gold, and white.

The Diablos were owned by Team Dynamics LLC, a highly successful organization dedicated to soccer education and player development at all age levels. Team Dynamics LLC also maintained a team in the Women's Premier Soccer League (WPSL), also called the Atlantic City Diablos.

History

Players

2008 roster

Year-by-year

Head coaches
  Matt Driver (2007)
  Greg Ruttler (2008)

Stadia
 Stadium at St. Augustine College Preparatory School; Richland, New Jersey (2008)

Logos

External links
Team Dynamics

 
National Premier Soccer League teams
Soccer clubs in New Jersey
2007 establishments in New Jersey
2008 disestablishments in New Jersey
Sports in Atlantic City, New Jersey